Cameroon is a country in central Africa. 

Cameroon may also refer to:

 Kamerun or German Cameroon, a German colony between 1884 and 1916
 Cameroun or French Cameroons, a French colony between 1920 and 1960
 British Cameroons, a British colony between 1922 and 1961
 Mount Cameroon, a volcano in Cameroon
 Cameroon sheep, an African breed of sheep
 Cameroons, supporters of David Cameron

See also

 Camarón (disambiguation)
 Cameron (disambiguation)